The Aerowagon or Aeromotowagon was an experimental high-speed railcar fitted with an aircraft engine and propeller traction invented by Valerian Abakovsky, a Soviet engineer from Latvia. The Aerowagon was originally intended for the express transportation of important documents, and to carry Soviet officials on government business.

Crash incident 

On 24 July 1921, a group of delegates to the First Congress of the Profintern, led by Fyodor Sergeyev, took the Aerowagon from Moscow to the Tula collieries to meet with local miners and to visit an arms factory. Abakovsky was also on board. Although they successfully arrived in Tula, on the return route to Moscow the Aerowagon derailed at high speed near Serpukhov, killing six of the 22 people on board. A seventh man (Paul Freeman) later died of his injuries. 

An official investigation concluded that the cause of the derailment was the poor condition of the railway track. In a 2007 interview, however, Sergeyev's son questioned this account, claiming that Leon Trotsky had arranged the accident.

Deaths 
The following people died as a result of the accident:
 , Bulgarian delegate
 Paul Freeman, Australian delegate
 , German delegate
 John William Hewlett, British delegate
 Fyodor Sergeyev (known as "Comrade Artyom")
  (born 1893), German delegate
 Valerian Abakovsky, the Aerowagon's inventor

All seven men lay in state at the House of the Unions, after which they were buried with honors in the Kremlin Wall Necropolis. Sergeyev is buried in Mass Grave No. 12,  Konstantinov, Abakovsky and Freeman are buried in  Mass Grave No. 13, while Strupat, Helbrich and Hewlett are buried in Mass Grave No. 14.

Legacy 

The Aerowagon was a precursor to the German Schienenzeppelin railcar, the American M-497 Black Beetle railcar and the Soviet turbojet train, all three of them being experimental vehicles featuring the combination of railcar and aircraft engine.

References

Bibliography 

 Alexey Abramov / Алексей Абрамов, By the Kremlin Wall / У кремлёвской стены, Moscow / Москва́, Politizdat / Политиздат, 1978, pp./стр. 399 

Experimental locomotives
Latvian inventions
Railcars of Russia
Soviet inventions
Scrapped locomotives